The Simoceratinae is a subfamily in the Aspidoceratidae, a family of ammonites in the Perisphinctaceae, that lived during most of the  Late Jurassic, especially in the Pacific and Tethyan realms. Early genera more closely resemble Perisphictidae and have constricted apertures. Later, more aberrant forms are unconstricted and develop grooved or concave venters.

References
 Arkell, et al., 1957. Mesozoic Ammonoidea. Treatise on Invertebrate Paleontology, Part L. (Ammonoidea). Geol Soc of America and Univ Kansas Press.

Jurassic ammonites
Aspidoceratidae